Dean Mellway  is a Canadian former Paralympic athlete. He won medals for Canada at the 1994 Winter Paralympics and 1998 Winter Paralympics for sledge hockey, and at the 1976 Summer Paralympics in men's snooker.

References

Living people
Paralympic sledge hockey players of Canada
Canadian sledge hockey players
Paralympic snooker players
Paralympic bronze medalists for Canada
Paralympic gold medalists for Canada
Place of birth missing (living people)
Year of birth missing (living people)
Medalists at the 1976 Summer Paralympics
Medalists at the 1994 Winter Paralympics
Medalists at the 1998 Winter Paralympics
Paralympic medalists in snooker
Paralympic medalists in sledge hockey
Snooker players at the 1976 Summer Paralympics
Ice sledge hockey players at the 1994 Winter Paralympics
Ice sledge hockey players at the 1998 Winter Paralympics